Christian Faure (born 1954) is a French screenwriter and film director.

Filmography

References

External links

1954 births
Living people
French film directors
French male screenwriters
French screenwriters
French-language film directors